The 2015 British Rowing Junior Championships were the 44th edition of the National Junior Championships, held from 18–19 July 2015 at the Strathclyde Country Park in Motherwell, North Lanarkshire. They were organised and sanctioned by British Rowing, and are open to British junior rowers.

Medal summary

References

British Rowing Junior Championships
British Rowing Junior Championships
British Rowing Junior Championships